The following is a list of awards and nominations received by director Baz Luhrmann.

Luhrmann has received various awards for his film projects. This includes an Academy Award nomination for Best Picture as a producer of Moulin Rouge! (2001). He has also received nine Australian Academy of Cinema and Television Arts Award nominations winning four times for Strictly Ballroom (1992), and The Great Gatsby (2013). He also received seven British Academy Film Award nominations winning Best Director and Best Screenplay for Romeo + Juliet (1996). He has also received a Golden Globe Award nomination.

He has also earned three Grammy Award nominations, two for Best Compilation Soundtrack for Visual Media for Moulin Rouge! Music from Baz Luhrmann's Film in 2002, and The Great Gatsby: Music from Baz Luhrmann's Film in 2014, and a nomination for Best Musical Theater Album for Moulin Rouge! in 2020. For his work on the Broadway stage he has received two Tony Award nominations for La bohème in 2003, and another nomination for Best Musical for Moulin Rouge! in 2020.

Major associations

Academy Awards
Moulin Rouge! was nominated for Best Picture at the 74th Academy Awards. Luhrmann was not nominated for Best Director, prompting host Whoopi Goldberg to remark, "I guess [it] just directed itself."

Australian Academy Awards
Luhrmann has received four awards from nine Australian Academy of Cinema and Television Arts Awards nominations.

British Academy Film Awards
Luhrmann has received two awards from seven British Academy Film Award nominations.

Golden Globe Awards
Luhrmann has received one award from five Golden Globe Award nominations.

Grammy Awards
Luhrmann has been specifically been nominated four times for Grammy Awards, with additional accolades for songs on the albums he has produced for his films, including wins for Lady Marmalade at 2002's Grammy's (Grammy Award for Best Pop Collaboration with Vocals), as well as nominations for Young and Beautiful for the Grammy Award for Best Song Written for Visual Media the 2014 Grammy's.

Tony Awards
Luhrmann has specifically been nominated for three Tony Awards, winning once. In addition, his production of La Boheme also won awards for Best Scenic Design and Best Lighting Design at the 57th Tony Awards.

Miscellaneous awards

ARIA Music Awards
The ARIA Music Awards is an annual awards ceremony that recognises excellence, innovation, and achievement across all genres of Australian music. They commenced in 1987. 

! 
|-
| 1998
| "Now Until the Break of Day"
| Best Video
| 
|  
|-

AFI Awards

Australians in Film

Berlin International Film Festival

Bodil Awards

Bogotá Film Festival

Cannes Film Festival

César Awards

Chicago Film Critics Association Awards

Clio Awards

Critics' Choice Movie Awards

Drama Desk Award

Directors Guild of America Award

Empire Awards

European Film Awards

Film Critics Circle of Australia Awards

Hollywood Critics Association

Hollywood Film Festival

Hollywood Music in Media Awards

Inside Film Awards

Italian National Syndicate of Film Journalists

London Film Critics' Circle

Love is Folly International Film Festival

MTV Movie & TV Awards

Online Film Critics Society Awards

Producers Guild of America Award

Palm Springs International Film Festival

Phoenix Film Critics Society Awards

Robert Awards

Satellite Awards

Teen Choice Awards

Toronto International Film Festival

Vancouver Film Critics Circle

Vancouver International Film Festival

World Soundtrack Awards

Writers Guild of America Award

Notes

References 

Luhrmann, Baz